Union Parish Airport  is a public use airport in Union Parish, Louisiana, United States. It is owned by the Union Parish Police Jury and located four nautical miles (5 mi, 7 km) southeast of the central business district of Farmerville, Louisiana. This airport is included in the National Plan of Integrated Airport Systems for 2011–2015, which categorized it as a general aviation facility.

Facilities and aircraft 
Union Parish Airport covers an area of 47 acres (19 ha) at an elevation of 121 feet (37 m) above mean sea level. It has one runway designated 16/34 with an asphalt surface measuring 2,997 by 70 feet (913 x 21 m).

For the 12-month period ending December 15, 2011, the airport had 15,500 general aviation aircraft operations, an average of 42 per day. At that time there were 19 aircraft based at this airport: 95% single-engine and 5% ultralight.

See also 
 List of airports in Louisiana

References

External links 
 Union Parish Airport (F87) at LaDOTD airport directory
 Aerial image as of January 1998 from USGS The National Map
 

Airports in Louisiana
Transportation in Union Parish, Louisiana
Buildings and structures in Union Parish, Louisiana